Sir George Head Barclay,  (23 March 1862 – 26 January 1921) was a British diplomat.

Early life
Barclay was born on 23 March 1862 at Walthamstow, Essex, England. He was the son of Richenda Louisa (née Gurney) Barclay (1827–1888) and Henry Ford Barclay (1826–1891) of Monkhams, Woodford. Among his siblings was Edith Richenda Barclay (mother of Sir George Nevile Bland); Sarah Adelaide Barclay (who married her cousin, Charles Alfred Leatham; son of William Henry Leatham); Henry Ford Barclay Jr.; Maj. Cameron Barclay (who married Hon. Charlotte Horsley-Beresford, daughter of the 3rd Baron Decies; Marion Alice de Gournay Barclay (wife of Sir Lancelot Carnegie); Charles Theodore Barclay and Col. Hugh Gurney Barclay, MVO (who married Evelyn Louisa Hogg, daughter of Sir Stuart Saunders Hogg). His father was a Justice of the Peace and served as the High Sheriff of Essex in 1886.

His paternal grandparents were Ford Barclay and Esther (née Reynolds) Barclay. His maternal grandfather was Samuel Gurney of the Norwich Gurney family that established Gurney's Bank in 1770, which merged into Barclays in 1896. Among his maternal family was uncle Samuel Gurney (a member of parliament for Penryn & Falmouth); aunt Catherine Gurney, who was the wife of Sir Edward Buxton, 2nd Baronet (an MP for Essex South and East Norfolk); aunt Elizabeth Gurney, who was married to Ernest Christian Ludwig de Bunsen (an Anglo-German writer); and aunt Priscilla, who was married to William Henry Leatham (an MP for Wakefield and West Riding of Yorkshire South). His first cousin, Sir Maurice de Bunsen, 1st Baronet, was the British Ambassador to Spain and Austria. Through his uncle, the Rev. John Gurney, he was a first cousin of John Gurney, the mayor of Norwich who married Isabel Blake-Humfrey.

He was educated at Eton College and Trinity College, Cambridge.

Career
On 24 July 1886, Barclay joined the Foreign Office and in 1888 became attaché in Washington, D.C., serving until 1891.  In that year, he became Secretary of Legation in Rome and, between 1897 and 1898, was posted to Madrid.

He subsequently served as Second Secretary in Constantinople until August 1902, when he was posted as Secretary of Legation at Tokyo. He returned to the capital of the Ottoman Empire as His Majesty's Minister Plenipotentiary at Constantinople. From 1908 to 1912, he was Envoy Extraordinary and Minister Plenipotentiary to His Majesty the Shah of Persia in Tehran. In 1912, he was appointed Minister at Bucharest, the capital and largest city of Roumania. Barclay retired from the diplomatic service in 1920.

Honours
He was invested as a Companion of the Order of St Michael and St George in 1898.  In 1906, he was made a Commander of the Royal Victorian Order.  In 1913, Barclay was invested as a Knight Commander of the Orders of St Michael and St George, and of the Star of India.

Personal life
In 1891, while secretary of the British Legation at Washington, Barclay was married to Beatrix Mary Jay Chapman (1864–1942) at the Jay Estate in Rye, New York. Her maternal grandfather was John Jay, the U.S. Minister to Austria-Hungary. Before their divorce in 1919, they were the parents of one child:

 Dorothy Katherine Barclay (–1953), an author who became Lady Kennard after her marriage to Sir Coleridge Kennard, 1st Baronet, who was then Barclay's third secretary in Tehran, on 5 April 1911.

In May 1920, Beatrix remarried to Maj. Gen. Raymond de Candolle, CB, C.E., son of Casimir de Candolle. In 1921, she lived in Smyrna, Greece.

Barclay died in London on 26 January 1921.

Descendants
Through his daughter, he was the maternal grandfather of Sir Lawrence Kennard, 2nd Baronet and Sir George Kennard, 3rd Baronet.

References

External links
 Barclay, Sir George Head (1862–1921) Knight Diplomat at the National Archives.

1862 births
1921 deaths
People educated at Eton College
Alumni of Trinity College, Cambridge
Knights Commander of the Order of St Michael and St George
Knights Commander of the Order of the Star of India
Commanders of the Royal Victorian Order